Xanthus (Xanthos, "yellow, blond") or Xanthos may refer to:

In Greek mythology
Xanthos (King of Thebes), the son of Ptolemy, killed by Andropompus or Melanthus
Xanthus (mythology), several figures, including gods, men, and horses
Balius and Xanthus, the horses of Achilles

People
Xanthus, Greek philosopher, master of the slave and fabulist Aesop
Xanthus (historian), a logographer who wrote a history of Lydia
Xanthos Hadjisoteriou (1920-2003), Greek Cypriot painter and interior designer
Xanthus Pagninius (1470–1541), Dominican, leading philologist and Biblical scholars
Xanthus Russell Smith, American artist
Xanthos (surname)

Geography
Xanthus (city) or Xanthos, city in ancient Lycia, the site of present-day Kınık, Antalya Province, Turkey
Xanthus (river) or Xanthos, river in ancient Lycia on which the city Xanthus was situated
Xanthus (Lesbos) or Xanthos, a town of ancient Lesbos, Greece
Xanthus Spur on the Trojan Range, mountain range in the Palmer Archipelago of the British Antarctic Territory

The arts
Xanthus, the antagonist in the musical People Are Wrong!
Xanthus, the fictional character in Robert Newcomb's fantasy series Blood and Stone
Xanthus, the name of Aristotle Bolt's estate in the Disney movie Escape to Witch Mountain (1975 film)

Species
Calliostoma xanthos, a species of sea snail
Cephonodes xanthus, a moth of the family Sphingidae
Myxococcus xanthus, a proteobacterium
Paracirrhites xanthus, a hawkfish from the Eastern Central Pacific
Protambulyx xanthus, a synonym for Protambulyx eurycles, a species of moth of the family Sphingidae

Other
Xanthus, the Latin form of Xanthos, an ancient Lycian city
4544 Xanthus (1989 FB) is an Apollo NEO discovered on March 31, 1989, by Henry Holt and Norman G. Thomas at Palomar Observatory
Xanthus class repair ship, class of five auxiliary ships built for the United States Navy and Royal Navy
USS Xanthus (AR-19), a Xanthus-class repair ship acquired by the United States Navy for the task of providing repairs to the fleet
Xanthus stele or Xanthian Obelisk, a stele bearing an inscription currently believed to be trilingual, in the ancient Lycian city of Xanthos

See also
Euxanthus
Xanthius
Xantho
Xanthosis

Kings in Greek mythology